The Goethe-Institut Dhaka fosters knowledge about Germany by providing information on German culture, society and politics. This includes the exchange of films, music, theatre, and literature. Goethe cultural societies, reading rooms, and exam and language centers have played a role in the cultural and educational policies of Germany for more than 60 years.

In Bangladesh, the Goethe-Institut opened at Gladstone House, 80 Motijheel Commercial area in Dhaka in 1961. The institut was relocated  into at present premises in Dhanmondi (House No. 23, Road No. 02) in 1967.

The Goethe-Institut is the Federal Republic of Germany’s cultural institution operational worldwide. The institute promotes the study of German abroad and encourage international cultural exchange. We also foster knowledge about Germany by providing information on its culture, society and politics.

Activities
 Language courses/Sprachkurse 
 Library/Bibliothek 
 Cultural program/Veranstaltungen 
 DAAD Information Point (higher studies in Germany) 
 PASCH (school project) 
 Newsletter

See also 
 List of Goethe-Institut locations

References

Organizations established in 1961
German language
Dhaka